This is a list of notable films produced in Slovenia or the predecessor countries on its territory.

Slovenia declared its independence from Yugoslavia on June 25, 1991. Slovene-language films produced in Yugoslavia before this date are also listed. Titles, translated titles, and release dates correspond to official entries in the Slovenian Film Fund database, which sometimes differ from entries in other film databases (such as the IMDb).

Earliest films

1950s

1960s

1970s

1980s

1990s

2000s

{| class="wikitable" width= "100%"
|-
! width=21% | Title
! width=16% | Director
! width=22% | Principal cast
! width=13% | Genre
! width=28% | Notes
|-
|  | 2000
|-
|Jebiga(Fuck It) || Miha Hočevar || || comedy ||
|-
|Nepopisan list(What Now, Luka?) || Jane Kavčič || Jan Grilanc, Iva Štefančič, Tanja Ribič || youth ||
|-
|Porno Film || Damjan Kozole || Matjaž Latin, Primož Petkovšek || drama ||
|-
|V petek zvečer  (Friday Night)|| Danijel Sraka || Primož Rokavc, Katarina Čas, Primož Preksavec, Tina Cvek, Tadej Čapeljnik, Manja Plešnar, Jernej Kuntner || comedy ||
|-
|  | 2001
|-
|Barabe! || Miran Zupanič || || ||
|-
|Kruh in mleko(Bread and Milk) || Jan Cvitkovič || Peter Musevski, Sonja Savić, Tadej Troha || drama || Slovenian submission to the 74th Academy Awards for Best Foreign Language Film; Golden Lion of the Future award at the 58th Venice International Film Festival.
|-
|Poker || Vinci Vogue Anžlovar || Borut Veselko, Urša Božič, Roberto Magnifico, Pavle Ravnohrib || drama ||
|-
|Sladke sanje(Sweet Dreams) || Sašo Podgoršek || Janko Mandič || drama || FIPRESCI award at the 2002 Festroia International Film Festival
|-
|  | 2002
|-
|Amir || Miha Čelar || Uroš Fürst, Marko Miladinovič || drama ||
|-
|Zvenenje v glavi(Headnoise) || Andrej Košak || Jernej Šugman || drama || Slovenian submission to the 75th Academy Awards for Best Foreign Language Film
|-
|Ljubljana(Ljubljana) || Igor Šterk || Grega Zorc, Tjaša Železnik, Jaka Ivanc || drama ||
|-
|Pozabljeni zaklad || Tugo Štiglic || || ||
|-
|Šelestenje(Rustling Landscapes) || Janez Lapajne || Barbara Cerar, Rok Vihar, Grega Zorc, Maša Derganc, Mateja Koležnik || drama ||
|-
|Varuh meje(Guardian of the Frontier) || Maja Weiss || Iva Krajnc, Tanja Potočnik, Pia Zemljič, Jonas Žnidaršič || drama ||
|-
|Zgodba gospoda P. F.(The Story of Mr. P. F.) || Karpo Godina || || documentary ||
|-
|  | 2003
|-
|Kajmak in marmelada(Cheese and Jam) || Branko Đurić || Branko Đurić, Tanja Ribič, Dragan Bjelogrlić || comedy ||
|-
|Na planincah || Miha Hočevar || Filip Đurić, Saša Tabaković || comedy ||
|-
|Pesnikov portret z dvojnikom || Franci Slak || Pavle Ravnohrib || costume drama ||
|-
|Pod njenim oknom(Beneath Her Window) || Metod Pevec || || || Slovenian submission to the 77th Academy Awards for Best Foreign Language Film
|-
|Rezervni deli(Spare Parts)|| Damjan Kozole || Aljoša Kovačič || drama || Slovenian submission to the 76th Academy Awards for Best Foreign Language Film
|-
|  | 2004
|-
|Delo osvobaja(Labour Equals Freedom) || Damjan Kozole || Peter Musevski, Nataša Barbara Gračner || drama ||
|-
|Dergi in Roza: V kraljestvu svizca(Alpenpolka) || Boris Jurjaševič || Marko Derganc, Andrej Rozman - Roza, Bojan Emeršič, Jernej Šugman || comedy ||
|-
|Ruševine(The Ruins) || Janez Burger || Nataša Matjašec, Matjaž Tribušon || drama || Slovenian submission to the 78th Academy Awards for Best Foreign Language Film
|-
|Tu pa tam(Here and There) || Mitja Okorn || Klemen Bučan, Miki Bubulj, Toni Cahunek, Adnan Omerović || youth/crime/comedy ||
|-
|  | 2005
|-
|Ljubljana je ljubljena|| Matjaž Klopčič || Nataša Barbara Gračner || || Dedicated to the hundredth anniversary of Slovenian film, the sixtieth anniversary of Ljubljana's freedom and to Rudi Šeligo
|-
|Uglaševanje(Tuning) || Igor Šterk || Peter Musevski, Nataša Burger || drama || Grand prize at the International Filmfestival Mannheim-Heidelberg
|-
|Odgrobadogroba(Gravehopping) || Jan Cvitkovič || Mojca Fatur || || Slovenian submission to the 79th Academy Awards for Best Foreign Language Film
|-
|  | 2006
|-
|Estrellita - Pesem za domov|| Metod Pevec || Silva Čušin, Tadej Troha || drama ||
|-
|Kratki stiki(Short Circuits) || Janez Lapajne || Tjaša Železnik, Grega Zorc, Jernej Šugman, Sebastijan Cavazza, Boris Cavazza, Mojca Funkl, Vito Taufer, Maša Derganc, Primož Ekart, Uroš Smolej, Matija Vastl, Igor Dragar, Tim Dekleva || drama || Slovenian submission to the 80th Academy Awards for Best Foreign Language Film
|-
|Noč(Let Me Sleep) || Miha Knific || Naida Raimova, Henrik Walgeborg, Christina Luoma || drama ||
|-
|Tea(Teah) || Hanna Slak || Nikolaj Burger, Pina Bitenc || fantastic fiction ||
|-
|  | 2007
|-
|Otroci s Petrička || Miran Zupanič || || documentary ||
|-
|Petelinji zajtrk(Rooster's breakfast) || Marko Naberšnik || Primož Bezjak, Vlado Novak, Pia Zemljič || || Slovenian submission to the 81st Academy Awards for Best Foreign Language Film
|-
|Instalacija ljubezni(Installation of love)|| Maja Weiss || Bernarda Oman, Igor Samobor, Desa Muck, Andrej Rozman - Roza || ||
|-
|  | 2008
|-
|Dar Fur - Vojna za vodo(Dar Fur - War for Water) || Tomo Križnar, Maja Weiss || || documentary ||
|-
|Lajf || Vito Taufer || Tjaša Železnik || drama ||
|-
|Morje v času mrka(The Sea at the Time of the Eclipse) || Jure Pervanje || Boris Cavazza || drama
|-
|Pokrajina Št. 2(Landscape No. 2) || Vinko Möderndorfer || Marko Mandić, Janez Hočevar, Slobodan Ćustić || || Slovenian submission to the 82nd Academy Awards for Best Foreign Language Film
|-
|Za vedno(Forever) || Damjan Kozole || Marjuta Slamič, Dejan Spasić || drama ||
|-
|  | 2009
|-
|9:06 || Igor Šterk || Igor Samobor, Silva Čušin || thriller || Slovenian submission to the 83rd Academy Awards for Best Foreign Language Film
|-
|Distorzija(Distortion) || Miha Hočevar || Žan Perko, Nataša Tič Ralijan, Robert Prebil, Jure Dolamič, Jani Vrhovnik, Domen Verovšek, Anita Barišič, Katja Škofic || youth drama ||
|-
|Osebna prtljaga(Personal Baggage) || Janez Lapajne || Klemen Slakonja, Nataša Barbara Gračner, Branko Završan, Boris Cavazza, Nina Rakovec || drama ||
|-
|Slovenka(Slovenian Girl) || Damjan Kozole || Nina Ivanišin || drama ||
|}

2010s

Other notable productions

Other films, partially or indirectly, but significantly linked with Slovenia in terms of production.

 No Man's Land (2001) - Bosnian-Slovenian-Italian-French-Belgian-British co-production
 The World is Big and Salvation Lurks Around the Corner (2008) - Bulgarian-Slovenian-German-Hungarian co-production
 The Chronicles of Narnia: Prince Caspian'' (2008) - significant parts were shot on location near Bovec, Slovenia

See also

 Cinema of the world
 List of Slovenian submissions for the Academy Award for Best Foreign Language Film

References

External links
 Slovenian film at the Internet Movie Database
 Filmography of Slovenian Feature Films 1931-2010
 Slovenian film fund

Slovenia
 
Films